Maskar is a village in the municipality of Topola, Serbia. According to the 2011 census, the village has a population of 206 people.

References

Populated places in Šumadija District